Andrzej Zając (born 21 February 1956, in Lipowa) is a Polish Paralympian who shared gold with Dariusz Flak in the Men's Individual Road Race B&VI 1-3 event. This was part of Cycling at the 2008 Summer Paralympics.

References 

Cyclists at the 2008 Summer Paralympics
Paralympic gold medalists for Poland
Polish male cyclists
1956 births
Living people
People from Nysa County
Paralympic cyclists of Poland
Sportspeople from Opole Voivodeship
Medalists at the 2008 Summer Paralympics
Paralympic medalists in cycling
21st-century Polish people